The House of Assembly (known in Afrikaans as the Volksraad, or "People's Council") was the lower house of the Parliament of South Africa from 1910 to 1981, the sole parliamentary chamber between 1981 and 1984, and latterly the white representative house of the Tricameral Parliament from 1984 to 1994, when it was replaced by the current National Assembly. Throughout its history, it was exclusively constituted of white members who were elected to office predominantly by white citizens, though until 1960 and 1970, respectively, some Black Africans and Coloureds in the Cape Province voted under a restricted form of suffrage.

The old House of Assembly chamber was severely damaged in a fire in January 2022.

Method of election

The members were elected by first-past-the-post voting in single-member electoral divisions. Following the abolition of the Senate in 1981, the membership of the House of Assembly was increased included 12 additional members, of whom four were appointed by the State President and eight were elected by the directly elected members. The elected additional members were chosen by proportional representation, by means of the single transferable vote.

Franchise

The South Africa Act 1909 provided that the franchise in each province should be the same as that in the corresponding colony before the Union, until altered by the Union Parliament. The Act included entrenching clauses, providing that black and coloured voters could only be removed from the common voters roll in the Cape of Good Hope, by legislation passed by a two-thirds majority by both houses of Parliament in joint session.

The franchise, in all parts of the Union, was initially limited to men over the age of 21. White women were enfranchised in 1929 and the remaining property and income qualifications affecting white men were abolished in 1930. The voting age was reduced to 18 in the 1960s. There were some additional qualifications and disqualifications which varied between provinces.

The voters in the Orange Free State, Transvaal and South West Africa had to be qualified white people, throughout the whole period when those areas were represented in the House of Assembly.

Cape Franchise

The Cape of Good Hope had a franchise based on property and wage qualifications, open to people of all races. At the time of the National Convention in 1908, which drafted the terms of what became the South Africa Act, "22,784 Native and Coloured persons out of a total of 152,221 electors" were entitled to vote in Cape elections.

From 1930, the traditional Cape franchise only affected non-white electors. The 1929 and 1930 extensions of white voting rights were not granted to the non-white majority of the population.

Until 1937, a small number of blacks in the Cape Province were included on the common voters' roll. Under the Representation of Natives Act (1936), three white members were elected to represent black voters in the province, with the voters' roll being limited to only 11 000.
In 1960, these seats were abolished.

Similarly the coloured voters in Cape Province were removed from the common (or general roll), under the Separate Representation of Voters Act 1951, although as the Act was challenged during the Coloured vote constitutional crisis and not completely enforced until the later 1950s, the last year to see non-whites participate in a general election was in 1953. Coloured electors complying with qualifications were subsequently given four white MPs between 1958 and 1970. These seats were abolished in 1968 through the Separate Representation of Voters Amendment Act, 1968, enacted on behalf of Prime Minister B. J. Vorster.  This removed all political representation for non-whites in South Africa; Indians had never had any parliamentary representation.

Natal Franchise

Natal had a theoretically non-racial franchise, which was similar to (but different in detail) from the property and income based franchise of the Cape. In practice, few non-white electors ever qualified to vote under it. It was estimated, in 1908, that "200 non-Europeans out of a total of 22,786 electors had secured franchise rights".

In 1935, there was one black elector in Natal. He retained the general roll franchise when the Cape black voters lost it.

South West Africa

In 1949, the South West Africa Affairs Amendment Act extended parliament representation to South West Africa's white minority, who elected six MPs to the House of Assembly. They were first elected in 1950, with the territory being represented in the South African Parliament until 1977. South West Africa's representation in the South African Parliament was abolished in 1977, to pave the way for independence for the territory, which did not occur until 1990.

However, Walvis Bay was transferred back to the Cape Province, thereby making it an exclave. From 1980, it formed part of the Green Point constituency in Cape Town, before becoming a separate constituency in 1982.

Tricameral Parliament

In the Tricameral Parliament, the House of Assembly (by this time numbering 178 members) was retained as the Whites-only chamber while the House of Representatives and House of Delegates were designated to Coloureds and Asians respectively.

Composition by election, province, and type

Abbreviations and notes:

 General roll electoral divisions (contested at general elections)
 Cape: Cape of Good Hope
 Nat: Natal
 OFS: Orange Free State
 SWA: South West Africa (represented in the House 1950–1977)
 Tvl: Transvaal
 Non-general roll seats (not filled at general elections)
 CCRM: Cape Coloured representative members (represented in the House 1958–1970)
 CNRM: Cape Native representative members (represented in the House 1937–1960)
 IE: Indirectly elected, by the directly elected MPs (represented in the House January 1981 – 1994)
 Nom: Nominated by the State President, one per province (represented in the House January 1981 – 1994)

Election results

The following table reflects only those members elected from general roll electoral divisions.

See also

Senate of South Africa
Volksraad

References

 Keesing's Contemporary Archives (various volumes)
 South Africa 1982: Official Yearbook of the Republic of South Africa, published by Chris van Rensburg Publications
 The South African Constitution, by H.J. May (3rd edition 1955, Juta & Co)

Defunct lower houses
History of South Africa
Parliament of South Africa
1910 establishments in South Africa
1994 disestablishments in South Africa
Defunct national legislatures